Journey to the Center of the Earth is a Ukrainian video game developed by Micro Application and published by Frogwares Game Development Studio on Oct 16, 2003. It was distributed in the United States by Viva Media. The game is loosely based on the novel of the same name.

Critical reception 
Jeux Video felt the game was "fun and original" and that it gave the player an opportunity to experience the "dreamlike underground world" described in Jules Verne's novel. IGN described it as a "decent title that keeps you gaming for cheap" but criticized its "clunky interface and unforgiving puzzles". GameSpy praised it's puzzles and story and disliked the interface.

References 

2003 video games
Video games developed in Ukraine
Windows games
Windows-only games
Works based on Journey to the Center of the Earth
Video games based on works by Jules Verne
Frogwares games
Viva Media games